The Theban Tomb TT359 is located in Deir el-Medina, part of the Theban Necropolis, on the west bank of the Nile, opposite to Luxor. It is the burial place of the ancient Egyptian workman Inherkhau, who was Foreman of the Lord of the Two Lands in the Place of Truth during the reigns of Ramesses III and Ramesses IV. He also owned Tomb TT299. Inherkau was the son of the similarly titled Foreman Huy. Inherkau's wife was named Wab.

Tomb
The outer chamber of the tomb contains offering scenes with Inherkau, his wife and their son Kenna. Scenes include depictions of the Book of Gates, the Book of the Dead, and two rows of Kings, Queens and Princes.

In the inner chamber scenes including Inherkau and his son Harmin are included. The chamber also contains a scene at a doorway depicting Ahmose-Nefertari and Amenhotep I (Berlin Museum ). Other items from the tomb include a lucarne-stela now in the Oriental Institute in Chicago (no. 403) and a coffin likely belonging to Inherkau's wife.

Gallery

See also
 List of Theban tombs

References

Theban tombs